This page describes the qualifying procedure for UEFA Euro 1988.

Qualified teams

{| class="wikitable sortable"
|-
! Team
! Qualified as
! Qualified on
! data-sort-type="number"|Previous appearances  in tournament
|-
|  ||  ||  || 4 (1972, 1976, 1980, 1984)
|-
|  || Group 6 winner ||  || 2 (1964, 1984)
|-
|  || Group 3 winner ||  || 4 (1960, 1964, 1968, 1972)
|-
|  || Group 4 winner ||  || 2 (1968, 1980)
|-
|  || Group 7 winner ||  || 0 (debut)
|-
|  || Group 2 winner ||  || 2 (1968, 1980)
|-
|  || Group 5 winner ||  || 2 (1976, 1980)
|-
|  || Group 1 winner ||  || 3 (1964, 1980, 1984)
|}

Seedings

Summary

Tiebreakers
If two or more teams finished level on points after completion of the group matches, the following tie-breakers were used to determine the final ranking:
 Greater number of points in all group matches
 Goal difference in all group matches
 Greater number of goals scored in all group matches
 Drawing of lots

Groups
The qualifying draw took place on 14 February 1986, in Frankfurt. West Germany qualified automatically as hosts of the competition. 32 teams entered the draw.

The qualifiers, consisting of 32 teams divided into seven groups; three of four teams and four of five teams, were played in 1986 and 1987. Each group winner progressed to the finals.

Group 1

Group 2

Group 3

Group 4

Group 5

Group 6

Group 7

Goalscorers

Notes

References

External links
 UEFA Euro 1988 at UEFA.com

 
Qualifying
1988

UEFA Euro 1988